Lorenzo Pellegrini (born 19 June 1996) is an Italian professional footballer who plays as an attacking midfielder and is captain for  club Roma. He represents the Italy national team.

Pellegrini is an academy graduate of Roma, having joined the club in 2007, and made his senior debut in 2015. He departed for Sassuolo later that year where he made over 50 appearances across all competitions before returning to Roma in July 2017.

Club career

Roma
Born in Rome, Pellegrini, who had suffered from arrhythmia as a youngster, joined the youth academy of local side Roma at the age of nine. Having previously represented the club in the UEFA Youth League, he was handed his senior debut at the age of 18 by manager Rudi Garcia on 22 March 2015, coming on as a second-half substitute for Salih Uçan in a 1–0 Serie A win over Cesena.

Sassuolo
On 30 June 2015, Pellegrini signed for fellow Serie A side Sassuolo for a fee of €1.25 million. In terms of the transfer agreement, Roma retained a buy-back-clause which afforded the club the opportunity to re-purchase Pellegrini at a future stage. He made his debut for the club on 8 November 2015, starting in a 1–0 league win over Carpi, and scored his first goal the following month when he netted in a 3–0 win over Sampdoria. He ultimately made 20 appearances for the season, including one in the Coppa Italia, and scored three goals. During the 2016–17 season, Pellegrini became the youngest player to have a hand in 10 goals in a single Serie A campaign, having registered six goals and four assists by 10 April 2017. He made 34 appearances across all competitions for the campaign, scoring eight goals registering seven assists, before re-signing for Roma at the end of the season.

Return to Roma

On 30 June 2017, Roma exercised the buy back clause of €10 million, which was included in Pellegrini's transfer agreement with Sassuolo, to bring him back to Rome on a five-year deal. On the same day Roma youth product Federico Ricci joined Sassuolo outright, for a €3 million fee. Pellegrini scored his first-ever goal for the club on 1 December 2017, netting Roma's third goal in a 3–1 league win over SPAL.

International career
Pellegrini has represented Italy at various youth levels. He made his debut for the U19 side against Germany in March 2014. He then enjoyed a brief spell with the U20's in 2015 before making his U21 debut against France on 2 June the following year.

He made his first appearance for the senior side in an 8–0 victory over San Marino in an unofficial friendly match on 31 May 2017, coming on as a half time substitute for Daniele Baselli. His official debut followed on 11 June when he appeared in Italy's 5–0 home win over Liechtenstein in a 2018 World Cup qualifier.

Later that month, he was included in the Italy under-21 squad for the 2017 UEFA European Under-21 Championship by manager Luigi Di Biagio. On 18 June, he scored the nation's first goal at the tournament, netting from a bicycle kick in a 2–0 win over Denmark. Italy were eliminated in the semi-finals following a 3–1 defeat to Spain on 27 June; during the match, Pellegrini assisted Federico Bernardeschi's temporary equaliser.

Two years after his promotion in the senior team, he was called back in the U21 squad for the 2019 UEFA European Under-21 Championship on home soil.

Pellegrini scored his first goal with the Italy senior side on 5 September 2019, in a 3–1 away win over Armenia in a Euro 2020 qualifier.

In June 2021, he was included in Italy's squad for UEFA Euro 2020 by manager Roberto Mancini. However, an injury later ruled him out of the final tournament, and Gaetano Castrovilli was called up in his place.

On 6 October, Pellegrini scored in a 2–1 home defeat to Spain in the semi-finals of the 2021 UEFA Nations League Finals.

Style of play
Regarded as a promising young player, from a tactical standpoint, Pellegrini's natural role is that of a central midfielder, who can be deployed in any position in a three-man midfield, although he is also capable of playing as an attacking midfielder and as a defensive midfielder. A tall, physically strong, yet agile, dynamic, energetic, and hard-working midfielder, his main characteristics are his stamina, ball control, movement, flair, and ability to make attacking runs into the penalty area from behind, as well as his eye for goal, and his striking ability from distance with either foot, despite being naturally right-footed. A former central defender in his youth, he is also an effective ball-winner, which enables him to break down possession, while his vision and technical skills allow him subsequently to carry or distribute the ball and provide assists for his teammates. His wide range of skills thus enable him to contribute at both ends of the pitch, and make him effective in linking both the defensive and offensive aspects of the game in a box-to-box role.

Personal life
Pellegrini is married to Veronica Martinelli. They have two children together.

Career statistics

Club

International

Italy score listed first, score column indicates score after each Pellegrini goal.

Honours 
Roma
UEFA Europa Conference League: 2021–22

Italy
 UEFA Nations League third place: 2020–21

Individual
A.S. Roma Player of the Season: 2020–21
UEFA Europa League Squad of the Season: 2020–21
Serie A Goal of the Month: September 2021, January 2022, March 2022
 UEFA Europa Conference League Team of the Season: 2021–22
 UEFA Europa Conference League Player of the Season: 2021–22

References

External links

 Profile at the A.S. Roma website
 
 
 Profile at Lega Serie A
 Profile at FIGC 

1996 births
Living people
Italian footballers
Italy under-21 international footballers
Italy youth international footballers
Italy international footballers
Association football midfielders
A.S. Roma players
U.S. Sassuolo Calcio players
Serie A players
Footballers from Rome
Association football forwards
Italian people of Albanian descent
UEFA Europa Conference League winning players